Zbyněk Hauzr (born 20 April 1973 in Liberec) is a former Czech football goalkeeper, who ended his professional career in FC Slovan Liberec on 1 June 2013 together with his teammate Tomáš Janů.

Coaching career 
After the end of professional football career he became goalkeeper coach in FC Slovan Liberec.

Personal life 
In September 2014 he was charged by Czech police that he participated in betting fraud organized by southeast Asian mafia. He had to partake in manipulation of three matches.

References

External links
 Profile on fotbal.idnes.cz 

Czech footballers
Association football goalkeepers
Czech First League players
FC Slovan Liberec players
FC Viktoria Plzeň players
SK Dynamo České Budějovice players
Sportspeople from Liberec
Living people
1973 births